Parres is a municipality in the Autonomous Community of the Principality of Asturias, Spain. It is bordered on the north by Caravia and Ribadesella, on the east by Cangas de Onís, on the west by Piloña and Colunga, and on the south by Amieva.

The municipality's capital is the village of Arriondas, which sits on the banks of both the rivers Piloña and Sella. The municipality consists of two main valleys (of the rivers Sella and Piloña) that stretch around the north. The rest consists of mountains from the Cantabrian Mountains and, to the north west, the Sierra del Sueve.

Parishes

The capital of the municipality is the village of Arriondas, located in the parish of Cuadroveña.

References

External links
Página de Parres 
Federación Asturiana de Concejos 
Areas Recreativas de Parres 

Municipalities in Asturias